Full Clip: A Decade of Gang Starr is a compilation album, featuring 35 songs released by hip hop duo Gang Starr between 1989 and 1999, plus a brief 'intro' track. It was released by Virgin Records. The album includes 21 tracks taken from the five albums it had released up to that point, eight of which were previously available only on soundtracks or vinyl singles, and three newly recorded tracks ("Full Clip", "Discipline", and "All 4 the Ca$h"). The compilation was certified Gold by the RIAA on August 19, 1999.

Critical reception
In a contemporary review for The Village Voice, music critic Robert Christgau called Full Clip an ideal compilation album that makes the duo's music seem less formalistic and more diverse: "It's a credit to the duo's constancy that the result plays like a single release."

Track listing

Disc one

Disc two

Album singles

Charts

References

1999 greatest hits albums
Gang Starr albums
Albums produced by DJ Premier
Albums produced by Guru
Virgin Records compilation albums
Hip hop compilation albums